The simple-station La Castellana is part of the TransMilenio mass-transit system of Bogotá, Colombia, opened in the year 2000.

Location
La Castellana is located in northern Bogotá, specifically on Avenida NQS with Carrera 28/Calle 86A.

History
In 2005, when the second trunk of phase 2 of the system, the NQS trunk, was put into operation, this station was put into operation. In this season, the inauguration ceremony of the NQS Troncal trunk was carried out, which was attended by President Álvaro Uribe Vélez, since at that moment the trunk had not yet been completely terminated (it was operative until Santa Station Isabel).

It is one of the stations of the system, next to the Gold and Water Museum, which does not have an easy route service because, on August 1, 2008, the B5-G5 service changed its route to Calle 80, omitting this station.

On the night of April 9, 2013, attacks against this station of the system were recorded. On that occasion, the stations Avenida Chile and La Castellana de la Troncal NQS were destroyed, where they left $ 22 million pesos in losses.
The station is named La Castellana due to its proximity to the educational center of the name, the neighborhood in which it is located, and the famous Teatro de La Castellana, which is located a few blocks away.

Station services

Old trunk services

Main line service

Feeder routes
This station does not have connections to feeder routes.

Inter-city service
This station does not have inter-city service.

See also
Bogotá
TransMilenio
List of TransMilenio Stations

TransMilenio